Thunder in God's Country is a 1951 American Western film directed by George Blair, written by Arthur E. Orloff, and starring Rex Allen, Mary Ellen Kay, Buddy Ebsen, Ian MacDonald, Paul Harvey and Harry Lauter. It was April 8, 1951, by Republic Pictures.

Plot

Cast
Rex Allen as Rex Allen
Mary Ellen Kay as Dell Stafford
Buddy Ebsen as Happy Hooper
Ian MacDonald as Smitty
Paul Harvey as Carson Masterson
Harry Lauter as Marshal Tim Gallery
John Doucette as Henchman Breedon
Harry Cheshire as Mayor Larkin
John Ridgely as Bill Stafford
Frank Ferguson as Tape Recorder Man
Wilson Wood as Johnson

References

External links 
 

1951 films
American Western (genre) films
1951 Western (genre) films
Republic Pictures films
Films directed by George Blair
American black-and-white films
1950s English-language films
1950s American films